Not with a Bang was a short-lived British television sitcom produced by LWT for ITV in 1990. It ran for seven episodes, each 30 minutes long. The show was a dark science fiction comedy, focusing on the end of the human race on Earth. The title comes from the last line of T. S. Eliot's poem The Hollow Men "not with a bang, but a whimper"; The concept for the series originates from a self-contained 1986 Radio 4 afternoon play of the same title, from which Mike Grady was the only cast member to reprise his role in the television series.

Premise
The pilot episode of Not with a Bang begins with a spoof episode of the iconic BBC show Tomorrow's World, (which is also a nod to the opening titles of apocalyptic drama series Survivors) where Judith Hann is presenting a story on how scientists have apparently isolated the hormone that causes aging in humans.  The chemical is then accidentally released from a vial and the effect spreads almost instantly, annihilating virtually all human life on Earth, turning people into little piles of an ash-like compound, before dissipating harmlessly.

The show then follows the plight of the four human survivors – three male, one female – who survive due to various far-fetched reasons – for example being sealed in a sound-proof booth during a pub quiz when the agent strikes the vicinity. The four characters are united by chance about one year after the event, and set up a base of operations in a country cottage. They then spend the next six episodes looking for other survivors, adjusting to life after the end of the world, and deliberating over the repopulation of the human race.

The show relies heavily on a small cast of esoteric characters, including:  rugby league fanatic Colin; everyman Brian, who comes closest to being the group's leader; and Graham and Janet, a bland couple who struggle over the issue of having children. Conversation between Graham and Janet frequently features Graham's reluctance and Janet's determination to have children, as well as Graham's extraordinarily low sperm count.

The pub name is never mentioned in the show and while an interior quiz advert does reference the Red Lion in Episode 1, there is also a V for Versus above that and you can just make out a H which would suggest they did not attempt to rename the pub as in an earlier shot of the outside of the pub you can see the White Hart sign, the shots from the outside are of the White Hart in the village of Bouth in Cumbria.

Cast
 Mike Grady as Graham Wilkins
 Josie Lawrence as Janet Wilkins
 Ronald Pickup as Brian Appleyard
 Stephen Rea as Colin Garrity
 Judith Hann as herself

References

External links
 Internet Movie Database
 Episode guide at the BFI website

1990 British television series debuts
1990 British television series endings
1990s British comic science fiction television series
ITV sitcoms
Post-apocalyptic television series
London Weekend Television shows
Apocalyptic television series
English-language television shows
Television series by ITV Studios
1990s British sitcoms